Soo Garay is a Canadian actress born in Toronto, Ontario, Canada. She is probably best known for playing Dr. Claire Davison on the TV series Psi Factor: Chronicles of the Paranormal.

Biography
Garay is the daughter of Valéria Gyenge, an athlete who won an Olympic gold medal for Hungary in 1952. Her father is János Garai, former Hungarian water polo player. and her grandfather was fencer János Garay.

Career
Soo Garay started her career on stage, and has become an accomplished theater actor. Some of her more notable credits include the national tour of Athol Fugard's My Children! My Africa!, Florence Gibson's Belle, Sarah Stanley's version of Romeo and Juliet, a 1993 outdoor production that received strong critical acclaim across the world.

Personal life
Soo Garay was married to Stargate Atlantis star, British-born Canadian actor David Hewlett in November 2000. They divorced in February 2004. She speaks Hungarian fluently.

Filmography

Film

Television

References

External links

Living people
Canadian television actresses
Canadian film actresses
Actresses from Toronto
Canadian people of Hungarian descent
Year of birth missing (living people)
20th-century Canadian actresses
21st-century Canadian actresses
Canadian stage actresses